Catellus Development Corporation is an Oakland, California based real estate developer founded in 1984 to be the real estate division of Santa Fe Pacific Corporation, as part of the Santa Fe–Southern Pacific merger. It was spun off into its own company in 1989, after the two railroads split. Catellus created contemporary developments throughout California, including the East Bay Bridge shopping center and Bridgecourt apartment complex in Emeryville in the San Francisco Bay Area. Catellus was also a proponent of the Emery Go-Round tram network.

History
In 1984, the Atchison, Topeka and Santa Fe Railway and the Southern Pacific Lines announced plans to merge all their assets into a single railway. As part of the merger, Santa Fe Pacific Realty, the real estate arm, was incorporated after the announcement. In 1986, the Interstate Commerce Commission denied the merger, as it would have created a monopoly on mainline freight movements in California and its bordering states. As a result, the two railroads split in 1988. The real estate arm was spun off in 1989 and was renamed Catellus Development Corporation to manage the stations and land parcels next to the railroad tracks remaining under their ownership. It would later come to own numerous properties across the continent.

On June 7, 2005, Catellus Development Corporation announced it will merge into ProLogis (NYSE: PLD) for $3.6 billion ($5.5 billion in 2018 dollars). The deal closed on September 15, 2005.

In late 2010, The private equity firm TPG Capital announced its intent to acquire a collection of real estate and the Catellus trademark from ProLogis. The deal closed in 2011.

Today, the developer operates with headquarters in Oakland, California, with regional offices elsewhere.

Notable assets

In California
The company owned Los Angeles Union Station; they sold it on April 14, 2011, to Metro. Catellus previously held an entitlement from the city council for developing sites surrounding the station until 2022, which included the station's restoration and seismic upgrades, in addition to constructing the MTA Building. The entitlement expired with the sale to Metro.

It remains the owner of the Santa Fe Depot in San Diego, and has created the Santa Fe Place transit oriented development on parcels surrounding it. The Grande twin towers are part of that project.

In the San Francisco Bay Area, it currently owns the Pacific Commons retail center in Fremont. The master planned Alameda Landing, located near Alameda Point is also a current project under their portfolio.

Outside California
Catellus has overseen construction of the master planned Mueller Community in Austin, Texas.

Projects 

 Airpark 599 - Stockton, California
 Alameda Landing and Bayport - Alameda, California
 Circle Point Corporate Campus - Westminster, Colorado
 East Bay Bridge and Bridgecourt - Emeryville/Oakland, California
 Foothill Glen - Union City, California
 Kaiser Commerce Center - San Bernardino, California
 La Union Station - Los Angeles, California
 Mission Bay - San Francisco, California

Source:

Works Cited

External links
 Official website
 Catellus on Facebook

Southern Pacific Railroad
Atchison, Topeka and Santa Fe Railway
Real estate companies of the United States